is a Japanese web manga series illustrated and written by Yukiwo that has been digitally serialized in three different magazines, since June 2008, and the manga is still ongoing. Ranko and Hikaru, the main characters and sisters in Musashino-sen no Shimai, are voiced in the "+Voice" versions of the manga. The story focuses on the everyday life of the two unemployed sisters living in Tokyo who love Lolita fashion. A live-action film based on the series has been released.

Plot
Two beautiful sisters, Ranko and Hikaru Midorikawa, live in a high-end apartment in Tokyo, and both love Lolita fashion. They live carefree and worry-free lives, as they are NEET. Often the sisters will go to the Akihabara and Shibuya shopping districts to shop for various garments, and converse with people. The sisters are unemployed because Ranko made a fortune off the financial market, and they no longer need jobs. Hikaru takes care of household duties, whilst Ranko surfs the internet and plays games.

One day, Hikaru decides that she and Ranko should no longer be living this kind of lifestyle, and applies herself for a job, a waitress at a maid café. Naturally, Ranko is worried about Hikaru and joins her at the maid café at a daily basis.

Characters

Main characters

Voiced by: Mai Goto (+Voice)
Ranko, or otherwise known as "Ran", is the older of the two sisters, but the shortest. She is 24 years old, but has a somewhat childish, innocent appearance. Like her younger sister Hikaru, Ranko loves anything Lolita and dresses in that fashion. She loves to go on online chat rooms, gamble, and play video games. Other notable traits of Ranko include her preference for fatty foods, such as ramen. Sometimes she will wake up at midnight and eat curry. Thanks to her money making off the financial market, she and Hikaru can live in luxury for the rest of their lives, and unlike Hikaru, Ranko is happy with that.

Voiced by: Rena Maeda (+Voice)
Hikaru, or otherwise known as "Pandora", is the younger of the two sisters, and also the tallest. She is four years younger than her older sister Ranko, being 20 years old, but may as well be the oldest, as she is more down to earth and caring than her sister, she is also better at household duties. Personality wise, Hikaru and Ranko are very different, except their love for Lolita clothing. Hikaru is socially inept, and worries a great deal. After her sister makes a fortune, Hikaru starts to work at a maid cafe despite the fact she could simply stay at home, or go shopping. Hikaru has a liking for yaoi manga.

Media

Manga
Yukiwo's Musashino-sen no Shimai first began to be serialized on Flex Comix's FlexComix Blood web magazine, in December 2007. Then, in June 2008, the manga transitioned to the FlexComix Next web magazine. From October 2012 onward, Musashino-sen no Shimai was digitally serialized in G-Mode's Comic Meteor magazine. So far, five tankōbon volumes have been released between July 2009 and May 2012. "+Voice" versions of the manga were published, which includes the voices of two main characters Ranko and Hikaru, who are voiced by Mai Goto and Rena Maeda, respectively.

Film
A live-action film for Musashino-sen no Shimai was first announced on Flex Comix's official website in August 2010. Screenplay was written and directed by Junichi Yamamoto, and the film was released by Is.Field as a DVD on November 17, 2012. Music in the film was provided by AOI, and the theme song, was sung by Yumi Matsuzawa. On August 23, 2012, the trailer was published on YouTube.

Cast
Ranko Midorikawa - Natsuki Katō
Hikaru Midorikawa - Sayaka Nakaya
Eiyu Ryo - Chisato Nakata
Hitoshi Munakata - Yuki Hiyori
Shizuru Munakata - Ayaka Komatsu
Takahiro Todo - Mitsuru Karahashi
Rin Kono - Yu Toa
Cop - Ujigami Ichiban
Nyanpu sama - Koriki Choshu
Chiba Shigeru - Iwami Yoshimasa
Hiro Ozaki - Fujii Paige
Nancy - Katsunobu
Ken - Kyousuke Hamao
Montesquieu President - Hitoshi Ozawa

References

External links
Musashino-sen no Shimai at Comic Meteor 
 

Comic Meteor manga
FlexComix Blood and FlexComix Next manga
Japanese webcomics
Live-action films based on manga
Manga adapted into films
Seinen manga
Webcomics in print
Japanese drama films